Hong Kong competed at the 1984 Summer Olympics in Los Angeles, United States.  The territory returned to the Olympic Games after participating in the American-led boycott of the 1980 Summer Olympics. 47 competitors, 36 men and 11 women, took part in 47 events in 10 sports.

Archery

Women's Individual Competition:
 Macy Lau – 2326 points (→ 37th place)
 Ng Wing-Na – 2148 points (→ 45th place)
 Wang-Lau So-Han – 2056 points (→ 47th place)

Men's Individual Competition:
 Steve Yuen – 2223 points (→ 54th place)
 Lo Kam Kuen – 2193 points (→ 56th place)
 Fok Ming-Shan – 2165 points (→ 57th place)

Athletics

Men's High Jump
 Lam Tin-Sau — 2.10m (→ did not advance)

Women's Marathon 
 Winnie Lai Chu Ng 
 Final — 2:42:38 (→ 31st place)

 Yuko Gordon 
 Final — 2:46:12 (→ 34th place)

Canoeing

 Ng Hin Wan – Men's K-1 500 metres
 Tsoi Ngai Won – Men's K-1 1000 metres
 Tang Kwok Cheung and Tsoi Ngai Won – Men's K-2 500 metres
 Cheung Chak Chuen, Ng Hin Wan, Ng Tsuen Man, and Tang Kwok Cheung – Men's K-4 1000 metres
 Ho Kim Fai – Women's K-1 500 metres
 Ho Kim Fai and  To Kit Yong – Women's K-2 500 metres

Cycling

Four cyclists represented Hong Kong in 1984.

Individual road race
 Choy Yiu Chung – did not finish (→ no ranking) 
 Hung Chung Yam – did not finish (→ no ranking) 
 Law Siu On – did not finish (→ no ranking) 
 Leung Hung Tak – did not finish (→ no ranking)

Team time trial
 Choy Yiu Chung
 Hung Chung Yam
 Law Siu On
 Leung Hung Tak

Diving

Men's 3m Springboard
Andy Kwan
 Preliminary Round — 433.89 (→ did not advance, 24th place)

Kam Yang Wai
 Preliminary Round — 387.63 (→ did not advance, 27th place)

Fencing

Five fencers, all men, represented Hong Kong in 1984.

Men's foil
 Ko Yin Fai
 Lai Yee Lap
 Lam Tak Chuen

Men's team foil
 Ko Yin Fai, Lai Yee Lap, Lam Tak Chuen, Liu Chi On

Men's épée
 Denis Cunningham
 Liu Chi On
 Lam Tak Chuen

Men's team épée
 Denis Cunningham, Lai Yee Lap, Lam Tak Chuen, Liu Chi On

Judo

 Yeung Luen Lin – Men's 60 kg
 Chong Siao Chin – Men's 65 kg
 Tan Chin Kee – Men's 71 kg
 Li Chung Tai – Men's 78 kg

Sailing

 Windglider

Shooting

 Men's 50 metre rifle prone
 Men's 50 metre pistol
 Men's 25 metre rapid fire pistol
 Mixed trap
 Mixed skeet

Swimming

Men's 100m Freestyle 
Khai-Kam Li
 Heat — 53.48 (→ did not advance, 36th place)

Men's 200m Freestyle
Tsang Yi Ming
 Heat — 2:03.11 (→ did not advance, 48th place)

Ng Wing Hon
 Heat — 2:03.66 (→ did not advance, 49th place)

Men's 100m Breaststroke
Watt Kam Sing
 Heat — 1:08.07 (→ did not advance, 37th place)

Li Khai Kam
 Heat — 1:08.75 (→ did not advance, 39th place)

Men's 200m Breaststroke 
Watt Kam-Sing
 Heat — 2:32.13 (→ did not advance, 38th place)

Men's 100m Butterfly
Tsang Yi Ming
 Heat — 58.25 (→ did not advance, 38th place)

Men's 200m Butterfly
Tsang Yi Ming
 Heat — 2:08.44 (→ did not advance, 29th place)

Men's 200m Individual Medley
Tsang Yi Ming
 Heat — 2:17.75 (→ did not advance, 32nd place)

Wing Hon Ng
 Heat — 2:18.64 (→ did not advance, 33rd place)

Men's 400m Individual Medley
Wing Hon Ng
 Heat — 4:58.98 (→ did not advance, 20th place)

Women's 100m Freestyle
Yan Hong
 Heat — 1:00.45 (→ did not advance, 26th place)

Kathy Wong
 Heat — 1:01.03 (→ did not advance, 32nd place)

Fenella Ng
 Heat — 1:01.82 (→ did not advance, 34th place)

Women's 400m Freestyle
Fenella Ng
 Heat — 4:43.41 (→ did not advance, 25th place)

Women's 200m Freestyle
Fenella Ng
 Heat — 2:13.94 (→ did not advance, 30th place)

Women's 100m Backstroke
 Lotta Flink
 Heat — 1:09.70 (→ did not advance, 26th place)

 Kathy Wong
 Heat — 1:10.19 (→ did not advance, 27th place)

Women's 200m Backstroke
Lotta Flink
 Heat — 2:29.00 (→ did not advance, 25th place)

Kathy Wong
 Heat — DNS (→ did not advance, no ranking)

Women's 200m Individual Medley
Lotta Flink
 Heat — 2:31.70 (→ did not advance, 25th place)

Women's 4 × 100 m Freestyle Relay
Kathy Wong, Fenella Ng, Lotta Flink, and Lai Yee Chow
 Heat — 4:12.53 (→ did not advance)

Women's 4x100 Medley Relay
Lotta Flink, Lai Yee Chow, Kathy Wong, and Fenella Ng
 Heat — 4:38.62 (→ did not advance)

References

External links
Official Olympic Reports

Nations at the 1984 Summer Olympics
1984
1984 in Hong Kong sport